Myanmar Alin is a state-run Burmese language daily newspaper and the longest running newspaper in circulation in Myanmar. The daily is considered to be the official mouthpiece of the government of Myanmar.

History
Myanmar Alin was founded as a magazine by U Shwe Kyu (Burmese: ဦးရွှေကြူး) and published by Ledi Pandita U Maung Gyi in 1914 during the British colonial era in Yangon. The paper was known for its anti-colonialist stance before World War II. The paper was nationalised in 1969 by Gen. Ne Win's military government.

Content
The front and back pages of all Burmese newspapers are almost all government related news. Most of the domestic news comes from the official government news bureau's Myanmar News Agency (MNA) (people?) read papers not for the news but for advertisements and announcements like weddings and obituaries.

Broadcasting

Myanmar Radio and Television
Myanma Alin is a Burmese free-to-air terrestrial television station such as MRTV, MRTV News, MITV, MRTV NRC, MRTV Parliament, MRTV Farmer and MRTV Sport.

See also
List of newspapers in Burma
Media of Burma

References

External links
Ministry of Information website with daily newspaper update
Myanmar Alin Facebook Page

Daily newspapers published in Myanmar
Mass media in Yangon